Pier Francesco Serragli (19th century – 1938) was an Italian Liberal Party politician and lawyer. He was the 13th mayor of Florence, Italy.

Works
 Un contratto agrario. La mezzadria toscana, Firenze, Libreria Fiorentina, 1908.
 Le agitazioni dei contadini in Toscana, Relazione al Congresso agrario Nazionale, Roma-febbraio 1921.

References

19th-century births
1938 deaths
19th-century Italian politicians
20th-century Italian politicians
20th-century Italian lawyers
Mayors of Florence